Murton railway station served the village of Murton, County Durham, England, from 1837 to 1953 on the Durham and Sunderland Railway.

History 
The station opened in April 1837 by the Durham and Sunderland Railway. Some tickets showed it as Murton Junction. It closed on 5 January 1953. The site is now a footpath that leads southwards to South Hetton, and northwards to Seaton and Ryhope.

References

External links 

Disused railway stations in County Durham
Railway stations in Great Britain opened in 1837
Railway stations in Great Britain closed in 1953
1837 establishments in England
1953 disestablishments in England
Murton, County Durham